Irving Sidney "Duke" Jordan (April 1, 1922 – August 8, 2006) was an American jazz pianist.

Biography
Jordan was born in New York and raised in Brooklyn where he attended Boys High School. An imaginative and gifted pianist, Jordan was a regular member of Charlie Parker's quintet during 1947–48, which also featured Miles Davis. He participated in Parker's Dial sessions in late 1947 that produced "Dewey Square", "Bongo Bop", "Bird of Paradise", and the ballad "Embraceable You". These performances are featured on Charlie Parker on Dial.

Jordan had a long solo career from the mid-1950s onwards, although for a period in the mid-1960s he drove a taxi in New York. After periods accompanying Sonny Stitt and Stan Getz, he performed and recorded in the trio format. His composition, "Jordu", became a jazz standard when trumpeter Clifford Brown adopted it into his repertoire.

Beginning in 1978, he lived in Copenhagen, Denmark, having  recorded an extensive sequence of albums for the SteepleChase label;  his first record date for the company was in 1973. He was reported not to have changed his style over the course of his career. 

From 1952 to 1962, he was married to the jazz singer Sheila Jordan. Their union produced a daughter, Tracey J. Jordan. He died in Valby, Copenhagen.

Discography

As leader/co-leader

Source:

As sideman 
With Gene Ammons
 Blues Up and Down, Vol. 1 (Prestige PR 7823)
 The Happy Blues (1956, Prestige PRLP 7039)
 All Star Sessions (1956 Prestige PRLP 7050)
With Ernestine Anderson
 It's Time for Ernestine (Metronome (Swd))
With Chet Baker
 No Problem (SteepleChase, 1979)
With Paul Bascomb
 Bad Bascomb (Delmark DL 431)
With Eddie Bert
 Eddie Bert (Discovery DL 3024)
 Eddie Bert Quintet (Discovery DL 3020)
With Art Blakey
 Les Liaisons Dangereuses 1960 (Fontana, 1959 – Original Soundtrack with Barney Wilen)
With Tina Brooks
 True Blue (Blue Note, 1960, BLP 4041, CDP 7243 8 28975-2)
With Kenny Burrell
 Blue Lights Two volumes, (Blue Note 1958, BLP 1596 and BLP 1597)
 Swingin' (Blue Note, 1956 [rel. 1980])
With Joe Carroll
 Joe Carroll (Charlie Parker CP 201)
With Teddy Edwards
 The Inimitable Teddy Edwards (Xanadu 134)
With Rolf Ericson
 Rolf Ericson and his American All Stars (Metronome (Swd) JMLP 2–105, EmArcy MG 36106)
With Art Farmer
 Art Farmer Quintet featuring Gigi Gryce (Prestige, 1955)
With Stan Getz
 Duke Ellington 25th Anniversary Concert (FDC (It) 1005)
 Getz Age (Roost RLP 2258)
 Hooray for Stan Getz (Session Disc 108)
 Move! (Natasha Imports 4005)
 Sweetie Pie (Philology (It) W 40-2)
 The Complete Roost Recordings (Roost CDP 7243 8 59622-2)
 Stan Getz Plays (Norgran, 1952)
 Stan Getz Quartet (Queen Disc (It) Q 013)
 Live at Carnegie Hall (Fresh Sound (Sp) FSCD 1003)
 Live at the Hi-Hat 1953, Vol. 1 (Fresh Sound (Sp) FSCD 1014)
 Live at the Hi-Hat 1953, Vol. 2 (Fresh Sound (Sp) FSCD 1015)
 That Top Tenor Technician Stan Getz (Alto AL 704)
With Gigi Gryce
 Doin' the Gigi (Uptown, 2011)
With Coleman Hawkins
 Coleman Hawkins and His Orchestra (Decca 27853)
With Joe Holiday
 Holiday for Jazz (Decca DL 8487)
With Howard McGhee
 The Return of Howard McGhee (Bethlehem BCP 42)
With Charles McPherson
 Beautiful! (Xanadu 115)
With Barry Miles
 Miles of Genius (Charlie Parker PLP 804)
With Sam Most
 Mostly Flute (Xanadu 133)
With Charlie Parker
 Complete Charlie Parker on Dial, Charlie Parker on Dial (Jazz Classics, Spotlite)
With Cecil Payne
 Patterns of Jazz (Savoy, 1956)
 Bird Gets The Worm (Muse, 1976)
 Shaw 'Nuff (Charlie Parker PLP 506)
 The Connection (Charlie Parker PLP 806)
 Cecil Payne Performing Charlie Parker Music (Charlie Parker PLP 801)
 Cecil Payne Quartet and Quintet (Signal S 1203)
With Oscar Pettiford
 Oscar Pettiford (Bethlehem, 1954)
With Doug Raney
 Introducing Doug Raney (SteepleChase, 1977)
With Dizzy Reece
 Comin' On! (Blue Note, 1960 [1999])
With Louis Smith
 Here Comes Louis Smith (Blue Note BLP 1584)
With Sonny Stitt
 Stitt's Bits (Prestige 1958 [1950], PRLP 7133)
 Sonny Stitt & the Top Brass (Atlantic 1963 [1962], SD 1395)
 The Champ (Muse 1974 [1973], MR 5023)
With Clark Terry
 Live at the Wichita Jazz Festival (Vanguard 1974, VSD 79355)
With Doug Watkins
 Watkins at Large (Transition TRLP 20)
With Julius Watkins
 Julius Watkins Sextet (Blue Note CDP 7243 4 95749-2)
With Barney Wilen
 Barney (RCA (F) 430053)
 Un Temoin dans la Ville (Fontana (F) 660 226-MR)
With Teddy Williams
 Touch of the Blues c/w Dumb Woman Blues (Prestige 715)
With The Birdlanders
 The Birdlanders, Vol. 1 (Period SPL 1211)
 The Birdlanders, Vol. 2 (Period SPL 1212)
 The Birdlanders, Vol. 3 (Period SPL 1213)
Various
 Various Artists  Birds Night: A Night at the Five Spot (Signal S 1204) Savoy (1958) (Savoy Jazz 2 LPs Celebration of Music of Charlie Parker) 
 Various Artists International Jam Sessions (Xanadu 122)
 Various Artists Lestorian Mode (Savoy MG 12105)
 Various Artists The Piano Players (Xanadu 171)
 Various Artists Birdology vols. 1&2 (Birdology, Verve 1990 CDs)

References

1922 births
2006 deaths
American jazz pianists
American male pianists
Bebop pianists
Hard bop pianists
American jazz composers
Savoy Records artists
SteepleChase Records artists
Xanadu Records artists
Prestige Records artists
Blue Note Records artists
20th-century American pianists
American male jazz composers
20th-century American male musicians
20th-century jazz composers
American expatriates in Denmark